The Roman Catholic Archdiocese of Tuguegarao is an ecclesiastical territory or diocese of the Catholic Church in the Philippines. Tuguegarao is a river delta city that became center of the archdiocese in the Province of Cagayan, on the island of Luzon. Its seat is located at the Saint Peter's Metropolitan Cathedral.

Description
The Metropolitan Archdiocese of Tuguegarao, the present territorial jurisdiction of the Archdiocese of Tuguegarao covers the entire province of Cagayan.

History 
The missionaries of Order of Preachers first evangelized Cagayan in 1595. They brought not only the tenets of Christian faith but also western technologies, infrastructures and ideas that helped in the livelihood and welfare of the Cagayanos. The Church of Saint Peter was constructed in 1761. It later became the diocesan cathedral.

The Diocese of Tuguegarao was created April 10, 1910 with decree of the Congregation of the Sacred Consistory "Nova Diocesum Circumscriptio In Insulis Philippinis". At the time of its foundation until 1951, its territorial jurisdiction stretched from the Batanes to Nueva Vizcaya.

The first bishop of Tuguegarao was Bishop Maurice P. Foley, D.D. and he took possession of his diocese on December 6, 1911. He convoked the first Diocesan Synod of Tuguegarao from April 16–19, 1912. After his appointment as bishop of Jaro, he was succeeded by Bishop Santiago C. Sancho, D.D. as the second bishop of Tuguegarao. He established the San Jacinto Seminary in 1980 in order to cater to the formation of native clergy and it was given to the administration of Dominicans of the Collegio de San Jacinto. He convoked the second Diocesan Synod of Tuguegarao from April 12–14, 1923.

Bishop Sancho was appointed bishop of Nueva Segovia in 1927 and he was succeeded by Bishop Constant J. Jurgens, CICM, D.D. as the third bishop of Tuguegarao. He was regarded as the "Teaching Bishop" because of his priority for education as a tool for evangelization. He also promoted catechism for children and the devotion to the blessed Mother in his diocese. He convoked the third Diocesan Synod of Tuguegarao from August 27–28, 1935. Bishop Jurgens was the bishop of Tuguegarao during the Second World War.

Bishop Jurgens resigned on May 6, 1950, and he was succeeded by his Coadjutor, Bishop Alejandro A. Olalia, D.D. He re-opened the San Jacinto Seminary as a minor seminary 18-years after it was closed by his predecessor in 1932. Bishop Olalia took part in the First Plenary Council of the Philippines in 1953. Upon his appointment as bishop of Lipa, a four-year vacancy ensued the diocese. The auxiliary bishop of Nueva Segovia, Bishop Juan C. Sison, D.D. served as apostolic administrator. There were significant events that occurred in those 4 years. On June 20, 1954, the image of Our Lady of Piat was canonically crowned by the Apostolic Nuncio to the Philippines, Archbishop Egidio Vagnozzi at the patio of the St. Peter's Cathedral. He also built the present residence and offices of the bishop of Tuguegarao.

In 1957, Fr. Teodulfo S. Domingo was appointed as the fourth bishop of Tuguegarao and he was the first native of Cagayan to be consecrated as bishop. Bishop Domingo took part in all the session of the Second Vatican Council and he was a witness to the early years of the implementation of council's reforms in the diocese of Tuguegarao. On September 21, 1974, Tuguegarao was elevated as an archdiocese by Pope Paul VI and Bishop Teodulfo S. Domingo was appointed as the first archbishop of Tuguegarao. He is the longest serving ordinary of Tuguegarao.

Having reached the mandatory retirement age of 75, Archbishop Domingo resigned on January 31, 1986, and he was succeeded by the auxiliary bishop of Tuguegarao, Bishop Diosdado A. Talamayan, D.D. as the second archbishop of Tuguegarao. He founded the priestly formation institute at the Lyceum of Aparri in 1990. He took part in the Second Plenary Council of the Philippines in 1991 and later convoked the first Archdiocesan Pastoral Assembly of Tuguegarao also that same year.

On March 10, 1997, the Sanctuary of the Our Lady of Piat was elevated to a Minor Basilica by Pope John Paul II.

On June 15, 2011, Archbishop Talamayan was succeeded by Bishop Sergio L. Utleg, D.D. as the third archbishop of Tuguegarao. Archbishop Utleg is renowned of his advocacies promoting social justice and the protection of the integrity of creation.

On October 18, 2019, Pope Francis accepted the resignation of Archbishop Utleg and he was succeeded by Bishop Ricardo L. Baccay, D.D. as the fourth Archbishop of Tuguegarao. He is the first archbishop of Tuguegarao from Tuguegarao City. He was installed on January 14, 2020, at the St. Peter's Metropolitan Cathedral.

Historical Summary

Coat of Arms

Suffragan dioceses

Episcopal Ordinaries 

Bishops

Archbishops

Timeline of Episcopal Ordinaries

Auxiliary Bishops

Other Priests of this Diocese who became Bishops
Miguel Gatan Purugganan† (March 2, 1957, appointed Auxiliary Bishop of Nueva Segovia; later appointed as Bishop of Ilagan)
Ramon Barrera Villena (March 30, 1963, appointed Auxiliary Bishop of Tagum; later appointed Bishop of Bayombong)
Salvador Lazo Lazo† (Aug 3, 1977, Appointed, Auxiliary Bishop of Nueva Segovia; later appointed as Bishop of San Fernando de La Union)
Rodolfo Fontiveros Beltran† (Mar 18, 2006, Appointed, Vicar Apostolic of Bontoc-Lagawe; later appointed as Bishop of San Fernando de La Union)
Danilo Bangayan Ulep (May 20, 2017, Appointed, Bishop-Prelate of Batanes)

Address
The office of the Archdiocese of Tuguegarao is currently located at The Archbishop's Palace, Rizal Street, Centro 10, Tuguegarao City, Cagayan, Philippines.

See also
Roman Catholicism in the Philippines
List of Catholic dioceses in the Philippines

References

External links
Catholic Hierarchy
CBCP
Parishes
 

Tuguegarao
Archdiocese
Tuguegarao
Religion in Cagayan